The Tomaru is a Japanese breed of long-crowing chicken. The crow may be sustained for some 25 seconds. It is one of four Japanese long-crowing breeds, the others being the Koeyoshi, the Kurokashiwa and the Tôtenkô.

History 

The Tomaru is thought to have originated in China at the time of the Tang Dynasty; the kanji character , 'tou', represents that dynasty.

The Tomaru was registered as a Japanese natural monument of Niigata Prefecture in 1939.

Characteristics 

The Tomaru has only one colour, black with a greenish sheen. The body is broad and compact with a full breast. The tail is held low, but higher than horizontally; although the sickle feathers may be long enough to touch the ground, this is not usually considered a long-tailed breed. The feet and shanks are dark slate-grey. The comb is single. The ears and face are red, sometimes with dark markings; in hens the face may be entirely black.

References 

Chicken breeds
Chicken breeds originating in Japan
Long-crowing chickens